Hugo Krabbe (1857–1936) was a Dutch legal philosopher and writer on public law. Known for his contributions to the theory of sovereignty and the state, he is regarded as a precursor of Hans Kelsen. Also Krabbe identified the state with the law and argued that state law and international law are parts of a single normative system, but contrary to Kelsen he conceived the identity between state and law as the outcome of an evolutionary process.
Krabbe maintained that the binding force of the law is founded on the "legal consciousness" of mankind: a normative feeling inherent to human psychology. His work is expressive of the progressive and cosmopolitan ideals of interwar internationalism, and his notion of "sovereignty of law" stirred up much controversy in the legal scholarship of the time.

Life 
Hugo Krabbe was born on 3 February 1957 in Leiden to a Dutch Reformed minister, Christiaan Krabbe, and his wife, Maria Adriana Machteld Scholten. He received his education at the Stedelijk Gymnasium in Leiden and studied law and political science at the local university. 

While at the university, he already began working as a clerk in administration. Krabbe was subsequently appointed as a law clerk in the provincial courts first of Gelderland and then of North Holland, where he served as adjunct-commies and commies-chef respectively. In 1886, he married the daughter of the Romantic landscape painter  (1809–1881), Adriana Petronella Anna Regina Tavenraat, with whom he had one son and one daughter,  (1889–1965).

In 1888, he was attached to the Ministry of the Interior as hoofdcommies. Under the direction of the minister Tak van Poortvliet (progressive liberals) he played an important role in drafting a proposal for reform of the electoral system that, had it been approved, would have extended the right to vote to all male citizens who could read and write and who were self-supporting. The reform was seen as an attempt to introduce universal suffrage, which the 1887 constitution had expressly rejected, and was met with strong opposition. Tak van Poortvliet was forced to resign in 1894, and Krabbe's career in public administration came to an end.

Partly through Tak van Poortvliet's intercession, Krabbe was in 1894 appointed professor of constitutional and administrative law at the University of Groningen, where he succeeded , who had moved to the University of Leiden. He accepted the professorship with an inaugural address on 2 February 1894 on De werkkring van den staat ("The scope of action of the state"). When Oppenheim was appointed to the Council of State, Krabbe joined Leiden University as his successor. On 4 March 1908 he accepted the professorship of constitutional and administrative law with an inaugural address on De idee der persoonlijkheid in de staatsleer ("The idea of personality in the theory of the state").

Krabbe remained at Leiden University teaching international law and public law for the rest of his career. Among his notable students at Leiden were Roelof Kranenburg (1880–1956), a constitutional lawyer and politician, and the economist . His teaching is also said to have influenced constitutionalists and politicians such as Ernst van Raalte (1892–1975), Frederik Johan Albert Huart (1896–1935), Ivo Samkalden (1912–1995) and Johan Jozef Boasson (1882–1967). In 1923–1924, Krabbe served as a rector. In 1927 he retired with a farewell lecture on his flagship topic, Staat en recht ("State and law"): "the core of constitutional law, which I have taught for 33 years". Three years after resigning as professor, he published his Kritische Darstellung der Staatslehre ("Critical presentation of the theory of the state") but soon retired as chairman of the "Vereeniging voor Wijsbegeerte des Rechts" (Association for the philosophy of law), which had been set up in 1919 partly on his initiative. 

Krabbe died in Leiden on 4 February 1936, aged 79.

Doctrine

Main themes 
Shortly before the start of World War I, Krabbe developed a theory of law and state that was destined to stir up much controversy in the interwar period. Some of its main ideas can be summarised as follows:
 The state is identical to its legal order, and the authority of the state is nothing but the binding force of its law. The notion of state sovereignty, central to the legal positivist doctrine of the time, must be replaced with the notion of "sovereignty of law" (rechtssouvereiniteit), which better expresses the objective and impersonal nature of authority in the modern state.
 The binding force of law is founded on "legal consciousness" or "juridical conscience" (rechtsbewustzijn, also translated "sense of right"), which is common to all mankind. Legal consciousness is a normative feeling inherent to human psychology, which explains and justifies the duty to obey the law. Legal consciousness also provides a linkage between the binding force of law and the democratic principle: as "social consensus on the legal validity of certain propositions", it evokes "the emancipatory power of the will of the people and the institutions of popular government".
 Rechtsbewustzijn is not limited to state law. International law, like any other law, is the product of the common legal consciousness; thus, state law and international law cannot be sharply distinguished and opposed one against the other: the validity of them both ultimately rests upon the same foundation – the rechtsbewustzijn.
 International law is not necessarily interstate law and can impose its obligations directly upon the individuals. There is no "adaptation" or "transformation" of international law into state law. International law is actually a "misnomer" as "it would be better [...] to speak of a supernational law, since this expresses the idea that we are dealing with a law which regulates a community of men embracing several states and which possesses a correspondingly higher validity than that attaching to national law". Thus, according to Krabbe international law must be regarded as a supranational legal system founded on a universal legal consciousness.
 The claim of a country to regulate its own communal life according to its own legal standards is conditioned upon the values and interests of the international community, and it is ultimately bound to wither as the political organisation slowly but inevitably moves towards the world state.

Theoretical and normative background 
In Krabbe's time, Dutch public law doctrine was strongly influenced by legal positivism, which was either drawn from the English analytical jurisprudence of John Austin, Westel W. Willoughby and others, or from the German Staatsrechtslehre of Carl Friedrich von Gerber, Paul Laband, Rudolf von Jhering and Georg Jellinek. Both these strands of jurisprudence shared the idea that the ultimate foundation of the law lies in the will of the sovereign and/or in the will of the state. Krabbe rejected that idea and placed the notion of legal consciousness of humanity at the basis of legal normativity. Under the influence of the psychological theories of Gerardus Heymans, who was a personal friend of his while in Groningen and had helped him to translate some of his publications into German, Krabbe developed a naturalistic jurisprudence with a psychologically and sociologically grounded concept of law. Relatively close to Otto von Gierke, Hugo Preuss, Leon Duguit, Georges Scelle, Krabbe's work exhibits a strong normative orientation and emphasis on progressive and cosmopolitan ideals, which make it an exemplar of a psychologically inspired natural law theory:

Theory of sovereignty and state 

In 1906 Krabbe published in German his seminal book Die Lehre der Rechtssouveränität ("The theory of the sovereignty of law"), which has been one of the most controversial works in Dutch jurisprudence together with his following book De moderne staatsidee ("The Modern Idea of the State"), published in 1915 and soon translated into German, French and English. The English translation of the latter book was undertaken by two renowned American academics, the political philosopher Georg H. Sabine and the professor of political science ; their eighty-page translators' introduction attests to Krabbe's international standing, his topicality at the time and the salience of his contribution to the international liberal values during the interwar period often associated with Wilsonianism. 

Krabbe countered the theory of state sovereignty with the notion of sovereignty of law, which he saw as an evolutionary accomplishment of the modern state. As milestones of the road to the modern state, he pointed to Thomas More's Utopia, in which culture rather than power is the purpose of the state, Hugo Grotius's natural law theory, and the notion of volonté générale at the heart of Rousseau's political philosophy. Krabbe also related the notion of sovereignty of law to the historical process towards an integrated world legal system and the emergence of what he called a "supranational law" taking precedence over national law (monism under international law). These cosmopolitan and progressive ideas, typical of the interwar "peace-through-law movement", were often received with incredulity by the legal scholar of the time: Roelof Kranenburg, a loyal disciple, wrote that Krabbe had in him "as much of the prophet as of the professor".

The identification of state and law, and the idea that state law and international law are integrated into a single normative system were embraced in the 1920s by the leading Austrian public lawyer and legal philosopher Hans Kelsen, who recognised the debt he owed to Krabbe and praised his work as a "masterly critique of the German theory of public law". However, as Carl Schmitt noted in 1922, Krabbe did not subscribe to the neo-Kantian epistemological and methodological assumptions of Kelsen, and was rather engaged in a sociological investigation on the distinctive features of the modern state, where "[w]e no longer live under the authority of persons, be they natural or artificial (legal) persons, but under the rule of laws, (spiritual) forces. This is the essence of the modern idea of the state". Carl Schmitt, who was the representative of an anti-liberal and thoroughly authoritarian theory of the state, saw in Krabbe the revival of "the old liberal negation of the state vis-a-vis law", coupled with a stale and uninspiring sociological methodology: Krabbe, contrary to Kelsen, conceived the sovereignty of law and the identity of state and law as historically evolved achievements rather than necessary transcendental presuppositions of legal knowledge.

Works

Books 
 (1883). De burgerlijke staatsdienst in Nederland (in Dutch). Leiden: S. C. van Doesburgh read online 
 (1886). De strafwetgevende bevoegdheid der Gemeentebesturen, toegelicht met het oog op de invoering van het nieuwe Strafwetboek (in Dutch). Haarlem: Mul & Vonk read online
 (1901). Administratieve rechtspraak (in Dutch). Groningen: Wolters read online
 (1906). Die Lehre der Rechtssouveranitat. Beitrag zur Staatslehre (in German). Groningen: Wolters read online
 (1915). De moderne staatsidee (in Dutch). 's-Gravenhage: Martinus Nijhoff read online
 (1919). Die moderne Staatsidee (in German) (2 ed.). Haag: Martinus Nijhoff read online
 (1922). The Modern Idea of the State. Translated by Sabine, George H.; Shepard, Walter J. The Hague: Nijhoff read online
 (1926). L'idée moderne de l'État. Collected Courses of the Hague Academy of International Law. 13 (3) read online
 (2006). Stella, Giuliana (ed.). L'idea moderna dello Stato (in Italian). Aracne. ISBN 978-88-7999-277-0.
 (1917). Het rechtsgezag. Verdediging en toelichting (in Dutch). 's-Gravenhage: Martinus Nijhoff read online
 (1930). Kritische Darstellung der Staatslehre (in German). Haag: Martinus Nijhoff read online

Essays and lectures
 (1894). De werkkring van den staat: redevoering bij de aanvaarding van het hoogleeraarambt aan de Rijks-Universiteit te Groningen, den 10 februari 1891 uitgesproken (in Dutch). Groningen: Wolters read online
 (1900). "Constitutioneele monarchie". De Gids (in Dutch). 64: 199–237  read online
 (1904). "Kiesrecht". De Gids (in Dutch). 68: 222–254 read online
 (1906). "De heerschappij der grondwet". De Gids (in Dutch). 70: 371–407  read online
 (1908). De idee der persoonlijkheid in de staatsleer: redevoering bij de aanvaarding van het hoogleeraarsambt aan de rijks-universiteit te Leiden, den 4 Maart 1908 uitgesproken (in Dutch). Groningen: Wolters read online
 (1910). "De eerste kamer". De Gids (in Dutch). 74: 48–89 read online 
 (1912). "[Vierde deel]Grondwetsherziening". De Gids (in Dutch). 76: 1–27 read online 
 (1915). "Het recht tot den oorlog". De Gids (in Dutch). 79: 311–346  read online
 (1916). "Compromis of capitulatie". De Gids (in Dutch). 80: 205–214 read online
 (1920). "Oud en modern staatsrecht". De Gids (in Dutch). 84: 427–456 read online
 (1924). De innerlijke waarde der wet: rectorale oratie (in Dutch). 's Gravenhage: Nijhoff read online
 (1927). "Staat en recht". De Gids (in Dutch). 91: 407–418 read online
 (1929). Natuurrecht: rede gehouden voor de vergadering van 23 Januari 1926 (in Dutch). Groningen: Vereeniging voor Wijsbegeerte des Rechts read online

Liber amicorum 
 Staatsrechtelijke opstellen: uitgegeven ter gelegenheid van het aftreden van Prof. H. Krabbe als hoogleeraar aan de Rijks Universiteit te Leiden. Handelingen van de Vereeniging voor Wijsbegeerte des Rechts (in Dutch). Vol. 12. Groningen: Vereeniging voor Wijsbegeerte des Recht. 1927 read online

Notes and references

Notes

Citations

Sources on Krabbe

Other quoted sources

External links 
 Texts by/on Hugo Krabbe in the Digitale Bibliotheek voor de Nederlandse Letteren (DBNL)

1857 births
1936 deaths
Writers from Leiden
Dutch jurists
Dutch legal scholars
International law scholars
Philosophers of law
Leiden University alumni
Academic staff of Leiden University
Academic staff of the University of Groningen
European social liberals
20th-century Dutch philosophers
20th-century Dutch writers